Lt. Col. Henry Robert "Bill" Hall (May 25, 1917 – October 25, 2012), founder of The Robert Hall Foundation, served as the Vice-President of the Scout Association and, after his retirement, became especially involved in assisting the rebirth of Scouting in the countries of Eastern Europe and the former Soviet Union, as well as a member of the Baden-Powell Fellowship and the Friends of Scouting in Europe,  financial foundations close to Scouting.

Born near London, he became a Scout in 1930 and would not leave Scouting for 76 years except during World War II. Legend has it that while he was crossing a monkey bridge, he saluted Lord Baden-Powell. Baden-Powell cried out, "Hold on with both hands and forget the salute!" He founded the 48th Camberwell Scout group in 1937 and became Deputy District Commissioner. After World War II, he became a commissioner for Greater London. At the same time, he became commissioner of  Jersey in the Channel Islands, where he had his new residence.

In 2007, Hall was awarded the 313th Bronze Wolf, the only distinction of the World Organization of the Scout Movement, awarded by the World Scout Committee for exceptional services to world Scouting.

References

External links

Recipients of the Bronze Wolf Award
The Scout Association
1917 births
2012 deaths
Deputy Lieutenants of Greater London